Castelo (English: Castle) is a former parish (freguesia) in the municipality of Lisbon, Portugal. It is one of the oldest parishes of Lisbon dated from 1147. At the administrative reorganization of Lisbon on 8 December 2012 it became part of the parish Santa Maria Maior.

Main sites
Castle of São Jorge

References 

Former parishes of Lisbon